Dairo José Esalas Berrio (born 27 January 1974) is a Colombian professional boxer. As an amateur, he competed in the men's light welterweight event at the 1996 Summer Olympics.

Professional career
In November 2007, Esalas upset the former world champion, DeMarcus Corley at the Double Tree Westshore Hotel in Tampa, Florida.

Ortiz vs. Esalas
On 3 May 2008, Esalas was knocked out by title contender Victor Ortíz at the Home Depot Center in Carson, California.

References

External links
 
 

1974 births
Living people
Colombian male boxers
Welterweight boxers
Olympic boxers of Colombia
Boxers at the 1996 Summer Olympics
People from Sucre Department
20th-century Colombian people